Frank Mantek (born 20 January 1959) is a German weightlifting coach and a retired weightlifter. He won a bronze medal at the 1980 Summer Olympics in the middle-heavyweight (under 90 kg) category, which also qualified as a bronze medal at world championships. In 1982 he won another combined bronze medal in the world/European championships.

He retired in 1983 and later admitted taking the performance-enhancing drug Oral Turinabol as part of the  East German training system. According to the doping expert Werner Franke, with an annual dose of 7600 mg Mantek was the second most doped East German athlete. Since 1990 he is a head coach of the German Weightlifting Federation, raising such athletes as Matthias Steiner. He suffered a heart attack in 1995, which he attributed to his past doping practice.

References

External links
Mantek Frank (GDR). iat.uni-leipzig.de

1959 births
Living people
Sportspeople from Jena
People from Bezirk Gera
German male weightlifters
Olympic weightlifters of East Germany
Weightlifters at the 1980 Summer Olympics
German sportspeople in doping cases
Doping cases in weightlifting
Olympic bronze medalists for East Germany
Olympic medalists in weightlifting
Medalists at the 1980 Summer Olympics